The Sammy Awards were an Australian television and film awards held annually between 1976 and 1981, initially supported by the TV Times and the Seven Network.

1976
Held at the Sydney Opera House on Friday 8 October 1976.

Gold Sammy: Helen Morse, Gary McDonald
Best drama series: Power Without Glory
Best lead actor in a television series: John Waters for Rush
Best lead actress in a television series: Penny Hackforth-Jones for Tandarra
Best actor in a single television performance: Hugh Keays-Byrne for Rush (ep: 'A shilling A Day')
Best actress in a single television performance: Maggie Millar for Homicide (ep: 'The Life and Time of Tina Kennedy')
Best new talent: Mark Holden
Best comedy series: The Norman Gunston Show
Best comedy television series writer: Bull Harding
Best variety performer: Don Lane
Best current affairs series: Four Corners
Best daytime series: The Mike Walsh Show
Best documentary series: A Big Country
Best light entertainment series: This Is Your Life
Best musical series: Countdown
Best film: Picnic At Hanging Rock
Best film actor: Peter Cummins for The Removalists
Best film actress: Helen Morse
Best film supporting actor: Reg Lye for Sunday Too Far Away
Best film supporting actress: Jacki Weaver for Caddie
Best juvenile film performance: Robert Bettles

1977

Gold Sammy: Harry Butler, Caroline Jones
Best television actor: Martin Vaughan for Power Without Glory
Best television actress: Lorraine Bayly for The Sullivans
Best documentary series: In the Wild
Best current affairs series: Four Corners
Best film: The Devil's Playground
Best film actor: Nick Tate for The Devil's Playground
Best film actress: Ruth Cracknell for The Singer and the Dancer

1978 

Gold: Mike Walsh, June Salter
Chips Rafferty Memorial Award: Ken G Hall
Best Actor in a Single TV Performance: Tony Bonner for End of Summer
Best Actress in a Single TV Performance: Davina Whitehouse for The Night Nurse
Best Actor in a TV Series: George Mallaby for Cop Shop
Best Actress in a TV Series: Lorraine Bayly for The Sullivans
Best Variety Performer: Julie Anthony
Best Variety Program: Julie Anthony's First Special
Best Comedy Program: The Norman Gunston Show
Best Drama Series: The Sullivans
Best TV Play: End of Summer
Best News Coverage: Brisbane shoot-out (QTQ9)
Best Documentary: A Big Country
Best Current Affairs Program: Four Corners 'Utah' report
Best Children's Series: Wombat (BTQ7)
Best Sports Coverage: Australian Open Golf 1977
Best Light Entertainment Program: The Mike Walsh Show
Best Writer TV Series: Tony Morphett for The Sullivans
Best Writer TV Play: Cliff Green for End of Summer

1979
Held in Sydney at the Seymour Centre on 17 October 1979.

Gold Sammy: Marcia Hines, Mike Walsh
Chips Rafferty Memorial Award: Stanley Hawes
Best drama series: Against the Wind
Best TV play: The Plumber
Best actor in a single TV performance: John Hargreaves for A Good Thing Going
Best actress in a single TV performance: Belinda Giblin for Say You Want Me
Best actor in a TV series: Gerard Kennedy for Against the Wind
Best actress in a TV series: Kerry McGuire for Against the Wind
Best television variety performer: Marcia Hines
Best new talent: Mel Gibson
Best film: Cathy's Child
Best film actress: Michele Fawdon for Cathy's Child
Best film actor: Alan Cassell for Cathy's Child
Best light entertainment program: Parkinson in Australia
Best comedy program: Tickled Pink (episode: 'Neutral Ground')
Best variety program: TV Follies (episode: 'Hollywood')
Best documentary: The Last Tasmanian
Best news coverage: Pentridge Riot (GTV9 Melbourne)
Best current affairs program: 60 Minutes
Best sports coverage: Australian Open Golf (Nine Network)
Best children's series: Top Mates
Best costume design: Claire Griffin for Against the Wind
Best art direction: Quentin Hole for Ride On Stranger
Best writer (TV series): Peter Yeldham for Run From the Morning
Best writer (TV play): Peter Weir for The Plumber
Best television editing: Michael Balson for Mutiny on the Western Front
Best film direction: George Miller for Mad Max
Best sound: Mad Max 
Best special effects: Mad Max
Best film editing: Mad Max 
Best theme music: Mad Max

1980 
Held in Sydney on 17 October 1980.

Gold Sammy: Bert Newton, Caroline Jones 
Chips Rafferty Memorial Award: Hector Crawford 
Best Actor in a Single TV Performance: Richard Moir for Players to the Gallery 
Best Actress in a Single TV Performance: Robyn Nevin for A Toast to Melba.
Best Actor in a TV Series: Peter Adams for Cop Shop
Best Actress in TV Series: Sheila Florance for Prisoner 
Best Film Actor: Jack Thompson for Breaker Morant
Best Film Actress: Judy Davis for My Brilliant Career
Best Supporting Film Actor: Robert Grubb for My Brilliant Career
Best Supporting Film Actress: Wendy Hughes for My Brilliant Career
Best Variety Performer: Garry McDonald
Best New Talent: Tracy Mann
Best Drama Series: Cop Shop
Best Short Drama Series: Players to the Gallery
Best Comedy Program: Kingswood Country
Best TV Play: Burn the Butterflies
Best Variety Program: The Royal Charity Concert
Best Film: Breaker Morant
Best Short-Length Film (factual): Now You're Talking 
Best Short-Length Film (fiction): Gary's Story
Best Animated Film: no award but a judges' commendation for The Little Convict
Best Documentary Program: Song for Melbourne
Best News Coverage: Moreton Bay Rescue BTQ7 Brisbane 
Best Current Affairs Program: 60 Minutes
Best Sports Coverage: Seven's Big League (ATN 7 Sydney) 
Best Children's Series: Young Ramsay
Best Light Entertainment Series: Parkinson in Australia
Best Cinematographer (film): Vincent Monton for Thirst
Best Cinematographer (TV): Ross Berryman for The John Sullivan Story
Best Art Direction (TV): Guhar Jurjans, Paul Cleveland, Alwyn Harbott for Lucinda Brayford
Best Art Direction (film): John Dowding for Thirst
Best Writer Feature Film: Eleanor Witcombe for My Brilliant Career 
Best Writer TV Series: Denise Morgan for Prisoner
Best Writer TV Play: Keith Thompson for Gail 
Best Theme Music: Peter Sculthorpe for Manganinnie 
Best Editing (film): Bill Anderson for Breaker Morant 
Best Editing (TV): Colin Grieve for Time for a Commercial 
Best Special Effects (film): Conrad Rothman for Harlequin 
Best Direction (film): Bruce Beresford for Breaker Morant
Best Direction (TV): Alan Burke for A Toast to Melba
Best Sound (film): Adrian Carr, Garry Wilkins for Harlequin 
Best Costume Design: Anna Senior for My Brilliant Career

1981 
Held in Sydney on 21 August 1981.

Gold: Michael Parkinson, Judy Davis
Chips Rafferty Memorial Award: Enid Lorimer
Best actor in a single television performance: Rade Serbedzija for The Liberation of Skopje
Best actress in a single television performance: Michelle Fawdon for Spring and fall
Best film actor: John Hargreaves for Hoodwink
Best film actress: Judy Davis for Winter of Our Dreams
Best actor in a television series: David Cameron for Water Under the Bridge
Best actress in a television series: Robyn Nevin for Water Under the Bridge
Best supporting film actor: Bill Kerr for Gallipoli
Best supporting film actress: Cathy Downes for Winter of Our Dreams
Best variety performer: John Farnham
Best new talent: Mark Lee for Gallipoli
Best drama series: The Sullivans
Best short drama series: I Can Jump Puddles
Best comedy program: Kingswood Country
Best television play: No award
Best variety program: Poo Over Brisbane
Best film: Gallipoli
Best short-length film (factual): Life Begins at Forty
Best short-length film (fiction): The Uninvited
Best animated film: No award
Best documentary program: Please Don't Leave Me
Best news coverage: The Belfast riots (HSV 7)
Best current affairs program: Scoop (0-28)
Best sports coverage: Hardie Ferodo 1000 (ATN 7)
Best children's series: The Patchwork Hero
Best light entertainment series: The Mike Walsh Show
Best cinematographer (film): Russell Boyd for Gallipoli
Best cinematographer (TV): Dan Burstall for Water Under the Bridge
Best art direction (TV): Logan Brewer for Water Under the Bridge
Best art direction (film): Herbert Pinter and Wendy Weir for Gallipoli
Best Writer Feature Film: David Williamson for Gallipoli
Best writer TV series: Ian Jones and Bronwyn Binns for The Last Outlaw
Best writer TV play: No award
Best theme music: Bruce Smeaton for The Timeless Land
Best editing film: Edward McQueen Mason for Roadgames
Best editing (TV): Gary Albery for 60 Minutes
Best special effects (film): Monty Fieguth, Chris Murray and Vic Wilson for The Survivor
Best direction (film): Peter Weir for Gallipoli
Best direction (TV): George Miller for The Last Outlaw
Best sound (film): Greg Bell, Don Connolly and Peter Fenton for Gallipoli
Best costume design: Roger Kirk for Farnham and Byrne

References

Australian film awards
Australian television awards